The women's heptathlon event at the 1998 World Junior Championships in Athletics was held in Annecy, France, at Parc des Sports on 31 July and 1 August.

Medalists

Results

Final
31 July/1 August

Participation
According to an unofficial count, 24 athletes from 19 countries participated in the event.

References

Heptathlon
Combined events at the World Athletics U20 Championships